Jalal Akbari Kelishadi (born 5 July 1983) is an Iranian footballer who plays as a left back.

Club career 
Though he usually plays as a defender, in the IPL 2005/06 season, Akbari was one of the best goalscorers for Sepahan, scoring 6 goals in 26 appearances for the club.
He always was a regular player during his time in Sepahan. He moved to Persepolis in summer 2009.

Club Career Statistics
Last Update  24 April 2011 

 Assist Goals

International career 
Jalal Akbari was a member of Iran national under-23 football team, participating in the 2006 Asian Games. In June 2007 he had his debut for the senior national team in a friendly against Mexico.

Honours

Club
Iran's Premier Football League:
Runner up: 1
2007/08 with Sepahan
Hazfi Cup
Winner: 4
2005/06 with Sepahan
2006/07 with Sepahan
2009/10 with Persepolis
2010/11 with Persepolis
AFC Champions League
Runner up: 1
2007 with Sepahan

References 

Iran Pro League Stats

1983 births
Association football defenders
Iran international footballers
Persepolis F.C. players
Saipa F.C. players
Iranian footballers
Living people
Sepahan S.C. footballers
Asian Games bronze medalists for Iran
Asian Games medalists in football
Footballers at the 2006 Asian Games
Medalists at the 2006 Asian Games
21st-century Iranian people